"Mammut" borsoni is an extinct species of mammutid proboscidean known from the Late Miocene to Early Pleistocene of Eurasia. It is the last known mammutid in Eurasia, and amongst the largest of all proboscideans.

Taxonomy 
"Mammut" borsoni was first described by American naturalist Isaac Hays in 1834 as Mastodon borsoni, for a tooth discovered near Villanova d'Asti in Piedmont, Italy. It was named after professor Stefano Borson, who originally attributed the tooth the species Mastodon giganteum. Since its description it has been attributed to both the genera Zygolophodon and Mammut. The attribution of "M". borsoni to Mammut has been considered questionable, as the type species for Mammut is known from North America, and there is no evidence that Mammut from North America ever migrated into Eurasia, with the similarities between Mammut and "M." borsoni being potentially due to parallel evolution, however, its actual generic placement is uncertain, so the species continues be provisionally named "Mammut" borsoni.

Description 

"Mammut" borsoni is one of the largest proboscideans known. A 2015 study estimated that some not fully grown specimens from Milia in Greece weighted around 14 tons with a shoulder height of 390 cm, with one specimen from the same locality known from an isolated femur estimated to weigh 16 tons with a shoulder height of 410 cm. Both of these weight estimates are considerably larger than any known modern elephant, and place it as amongst the largest land mammals to have ever lived. The upper tusks are straight to slightly curved, and the longest known amongst proboscideans, with one preserved tusk from Milia measuring over 5 metres in length. In comparsion to earlier mammutids like Zygolophodon, the lower jaw (particularly the mandibular symphysis) is relatively short, but still bears small lower tusks.

Ecology 
Dental microwear analysis of specimens from the Pliocene of Romania suggest that "M". borsoni was a browser.

Distribution and chronology 
"Mammut" borsoni is known from localities across Europe, spanning from the Iberian Peninsula in the west to Ukraine and Greece in the east. Remains have also been reported from China. Some authors have suggested that the species derived from Zygolophodon turicensis. The oldest specimens date to the late Miocene, while the youngest date to the earliest Pleistocene, around 2-2.5 million years ago.

References 

Mastodons